General David Anderson (12 August 1821 – 7 October 1909) was a British Army officer who became the last Governor of the Royal Military College, Sandhurst, before the post was merged with that of Commandant of the college.

Military career
Anderson was commissioned into the British Army in 1838. He served on the North West Frontier of India from 1853 and was decorated, and in 1885 was appointed to command the Aldershot division. He was Governor of the Royal Military College, Sandhurst, from 1886 to 1888, when he was promoted to a full General and retired from the service.

In retirement, he served as Colonel of the Cheshire Regiment, an honorary appointment received 3 March 1894.

Family
On 18 November 1863, Anderson married his cousin Charlotte, second daughter of David Anderson of St Germains, Haddingtonshire, and had five children, Lt-Gen Sir Warren Hastings, Admiral Sir David Murray, Charlotte Mary, Eleanor Florence and Violet Ann.  The sons both married but there were no grandchildren.

References

 

1821 births
1909 deaths
British Army generals
Governors of the Royal Military College, Sandhurst